Nick Adams (born 11 October 1977 in Preston, England) is an English rugby union player and coach for Stourbridge R.F.C.

Nick Adams' position of choice is as a prop.

He has previously played for US Montauban, CS Bourgoin-Jallieu, Cornish Pirates and London Wasps.

In April 2012, Adams won the National League 3 Midlands title with Rugby Lions in his first season. The Lions achieved the championship having won every game they played. Adams left the Lions in June 2012, joining Stourbridge Saxons as a player and coach.

References

External links
Wasps profile

1977 births
Living people
Alumni of the University of Leicester
English rugby union players
Nottingham R.F.C. players
Rugby union players from Preston, Lancashire
Wasps RFC players
Rugby union props